Rosa Margarita Merino Corcio (born 23 July 1992) is a Salvadoran footballer who plays as a midfielder. She has been a member of the El Salvador women's national team.

International career
Merino capped for El Salvador at senior level during the 2010 CONCACAF Women's World Cup Qualifying qualification.

International goals
Scores and results list El Salvador's goal tally first.

See also
List of El Salvador women's international footballers

References

1992 births
Living people
Salvadoran women's footballers
Women's association football midfielders
El Salvador women's international footballers